The 1959 British Grand Prix was a Formula One motor race held at the Aintree Circuit on 18 July 1959. It was race 5 of 9 in the 1959 World Championship of Drivers and race 4 of 8 in the 1959 International Cup for Formula One Manufacturers. It was the 14th British Grand Prix and the third to be held at the Aintree Motor Racing Circuit, a circuit mapped out in the grounds of the Aintree Racecourse horse racing venue. The race was held over 75 laps of the four kilometre circuit for a race distance of 362 kilometres.

The race was won by Australian Jack Brabham taking his second Grand Prix victory in a works Cooper T51. Brabham dominated the race, leading all 75 laps to win by 22 seconds over British driver Stirling Moss driving a British Racing Partnership entered BRM P25. It was the first time a BRP entry finished in the top three. Brabham's Cooper Car Company teammate, New Zealander Bruce McLaren finished in third place, just 0.2 seconds behind Moss, having lost second place late in the race. Harry Schell finished fourth for the Owen Racing Organisation BRM team a lap behind Brabham.

The British Grand Prix had the biggest entry of the season outside the Indianapolis 500 with 30 cars competing and 24 starting the race, all despite the absence of Ferrari. Strikes in Italy trapped the team at home, leaving the British teams to fight over the race. Ferrari's new lead driver Tony Brooks was given a release and started the race in a Vanwall but was the first to retire with misfire after 13 laps having started in a lowly 17th after winning the French Grand Prix a few weeks earlier.

The win saw Brabham expand his points lead over Brooks to 13 points. Moss and McLaren moved into fourth place just half a point behind the absent Phil Hill.

On the last lap of this race, McLaren became the youngest driver to set a fastest lap in Formula One, aged 21 years and 322 days. It was another 44 years before Fernando Alonso relieved him of that achievement with fastest lap in the 2003 Canadian GP. He was a day younger aged 21 years and 321 days.

Classification

Qualifying

Race

Notes
 – Includes 0.5 points for shared fastest lap

Championship standings after the race

Drivers' Championship standings

Constructors' Championship standings

 Notes: Only the top five positions are included for both sets of standings.

References

External links

 (Race results and statistics.)

British Grand Prix
British Grand Prix
1959 in British motorsport